We Shall All Be Healed is the eighth studio album by The Mountain Goats. The album focuses on semi-fictional accounts of band leader John Darnielle's years as a teenager, particularly his friends' and acquaintances' experiences in California and in Portland, Oregon, as methamphetamine addicts. As The Mountain Goats' official website puts it: "All of the songs on We Shall All Be Healed are based on people John used to know. Most of them are probably dead or in jail by now." Like Tallahassee, but unlike the rest of Darnielle's repertoire up to its release, We Shall All Be Healed was recorded with a full band in a recording studio, and produced by John Vanderslice, as opposed to The Mountain Goats' previous practice of recording at home on a boom box with, at most, one or two backup vocalists or a bassist. "Palmcorder Yajna" (the primary single), when played in concert, is often played with the backing of members of one or more of the opening acts on tour with The Mountain Goats. The song "Cotton" was featured in an episode of the television series Weeds.

One of the provisional titles for the album was New Age Music Will Save Your Wretched Soul.

Reception

We Shall All Be Healed was generally liked by critics, but divisive in some circles regarding the different direction The Mountain Goats took in the albums creation. With a new production style and a band playing alongside the typically solo John Darnielle, came criticism regarding the changed sound, and its effect the heart of the music. Some of the critics see this as less authentic to the sound of The Mountain Goats used in earlier albums and states that the band is not used that effectively in the first place. Other critics, however, say that the change leads to a clearer and more simple sound that adds to John Darnielle's voice creating a more in-depth album. Another criticism of the album is that the album offers nothing new in the growth of the Mountain Goats, that many of the songs have the same rhythmic and lyrical feeling as past albums. The critics argue that because of this lack of innovation within the work that the overall album falls short of expectations but is still enjoyable. This leads to the analysis of the songs themselves where "The Young Thousands" and "Cotton" are singled out as being some of the stronger compositions. "The Young Thousands" is singled out because of its uplifting and powerful tone throughout the song while "Cotton" is discussed because of the beat used and the lyrics.

Track listing

Personnel
 John Darnielle – vocals, guitar
 John Vanderslice – production
 Franklin Bruno – piano
 Peter Hughes – bass
 Nora Danielson – violin
 Christopher McGuire – drums

References

External links
 

2004 albums
The Mountain Goats albums
4AD albums
Albums recorded at Bear Creek Studio
Albums produced by Scott Solter